Colombo - Badulla Night Mail Train is a night time passenger and mail train that runs between Colombo and Badulla in Sri Lanka.

The Badulla-bound train departs from Colombo at 8:00pm, while the Colombo-bound train leaves Badulla at 5:00pm. The trip takes about 10 hours. This timetable is occasionally disrupted by unexpected events, weather, and track conditions.

Services
The train offers three classes:

1st class
2nd class
3rd class typically gets very crowded and carries only basic facilities.

Route
Colombo - Badulla Night Mail Train travels the length of Sri Lanka Railways' Main Line through the hill country.

Colombo - Badulla Night Mail Train begins its journey at Colombo Fort Station and stops only at Ragama, Gampaha, Veyangoda. Then it comes to Polgahawela junction, where the Northern Line Branches off. Train continues its journey on Main Line. At 9:45 pm, it reaches Rambukkana railway station, where the double line railway from Colombo Fort Station ends. From Rambukkana, it has to climb a steep slope of 1:44, into the hills of the upcountry. But it is a difficult task for M6 locomotive to do alone. So M5 class locomotive is attached at the rear end, as a banking engine. With the power of 2 engines, train departs Rambukkana and continues its journey to the next stop at Kadugannawa. The rear engine is removed and the train travels to the Peradeniya junction. Rear mail carriage is removed from the train and it will be attached to a train, which goes to Kandy. The train, carrying 12 carriages departs for Badulla. The next stop is Gampola Railway Station. Again a M6 class locomotive is attached at the rear end, to climb steep slopes, from Gampola to Pattipola. In the midnight, the train comes to Nawalapitiya station, where technical officers check braking systems for safe ride through the mountains. Also engine drivers change. After leaving Nawalapitiya station, The number 1046 Badulla-Colombo Night Mail Train, which was commenced from Badulla to Colombo Fort, meets at Inguru Oya Railway Station. The Train continues its journey passing Hatton, Nanuoya, Ambewela and at 4:00pm, it reaches Pattipola, the highest altitude railway station in Sri Lanka. In here, rear locomotive is uncoupled and brought to the front end of the train and re-coupled, as a pilot engine, to begin its descend from Pattipola to Badulla. Dynamic Brakes are used for this continuous braking to reduce the wear of friction-based braking components. The train passes Ohiya, Idalgashinna, Haputale, Diyathalawa, Bandarawela, Ella, Demodara and reaches Badulla, in the morning.

Rolling Stock
The service is run by M6 locomotives pulling Romanian-built  ASTRA passenger coaches.

See also
 Sri Lanka Railways
 List of named passenger trains of Sri Lanka

References

External links
Train Simulator Sri Lanka, on Facebook
Colombo Badulla Night Mail Train - Sinhala Article 

Passenger rail transport in Sri Lanka